Dame Johannah Cutts DBE, styled Mrs Justice Cutts, is a British High Court Judge.

Early Life 
Cutts was born in Taplow on the 13th of January, 1964. She attended St Helen and St Katherine's School in Abingdon-on-Thames. She would later complete a Bachelor of Laws at Anglia Ruskin University, (formerly known as The Chelmer Institute), making her the first in her family to do so.

Legal Career 
Cutts was called to the Bar by Inner Temple in 1986 and specialised in criminal law, with a particular interest in cases involving vulnerable persons. Whilst practicing, Cutts developed best practices and procedures in the handling of serious sexual assault cases involving young or vulnerable victims. In 2005, she would contribute to the 5th edditon of 'Rook and Ward on Sexual Offences'. 

Before becoming a Judge, Cutts practiced at the London based 'Foundry Chambers', formerly known as '9-12 Bell Yard'.

She would be appointed King's Counsel in 2008.

Cutts would be appointed as a Recorder in 2002 and later a Circuit Judge in 2011, sitting at Aylesbury and Reading Crown Courts.

The Lord Chief Justice then in 2014, appointed Cutts as a Deputy High Court Judge and directed to sit in the Court of Appeal's Criminal Division. In October 2018 Cutts would be assigned to the King's Bench division of the High Court. Taking up post from the 1st of October 2018, she received her customary DBE from the late monarch Queen Elizabeth II.

References 

Dames Commander of the Order of the British Empire
British women judges
21st-century English judges

1964 births
Living people